Shahid Kazemi Stadium  is a football stadium in Tehran, Iran.  It is the home stadium of Persepolis F.C. The stadium, which holds 15,000 people, was opened in 2013.
Inside the complex, there are training areas. There are also a sauna, steam and weight rooms, a restaurant, conference rooms and offices.

Record of Results

Persepolis
Persepolis's complete competitive record at Kazemi Stadium is as follows:

See also
 Persepolis F.C.
 Derafshifar Stadium

References

Football venues in Iran
Stadium
Sports venues in Tehran
Association football training grounds in Iran